West Virginia Media Holdings was a media company in West Virginia.  It owned television stations in each of the four main media markets in the state, as well as a weekly newspaper.

The group owned WOWK-TV in Huntington, WVNS-TV in Lewisburg, and WTRF-TV in Wheeling, West Virginia, which were all affiliated with the CBS network; and WBOY-TV in Clarksburg which was affiliated with NBC. WVNS and WTRF also carried Fox on their digital subchannels, while both subchannels carried MyNetworkTV in addition to Fox as a secondary affiliate. It also owned a weekly newspaper, The State Journal, which mainly covers state commerce and political news.

The group was founded in 2001. The largest private investor in the company was Bray Cary, who served as president and CEO. Cary was formerly an executive with NASCAR, and was responsible for its television contracts before they switched to a bulk network model, along with college basketball syndication.

In August 2008, both WTRF and WBOY began carrying ABC programming on their digital subchannel. Previously, longtime ABC affiliate WTAE-TV in Pittsburgh served both markets as the de facto ABC affiliate and remains on cable in both markets (Fox Ohio Valley replaced WPGH on Comcast systems as the only Fox affiliate on the Comcast channel lineup).

On November 17, 2015, WVMH announced that it would sell its stations to Nexstar Broadcasting Group for $130 million. The company would take over the stations' non-license assets under a time brokerage agreement in December 2015 until the formal completion of the deal, expected in late-2016. The two companies viewed the acquisition as being a complement to Nexstar's WHAG-TV, whose coverage area includes the Eastern Panhandle region. Nexstar CEO Perry A. Sook is an alumnus of WOWK. The sale was completed on January 31, 2017.

The State Journal was separately acquired by NCWV Media in December 2016.

Former WVMH-owned stations
Stations are arranged alphabetically by state and by city of license.

References

Companies based in West Virginia
Defunct television broadcasting companies of the United States
Mass media in West Virginia
2001 establishments in West Virginia
2017 disestablishments in West Virginia
Mass media companies established in 2001
Mass media companies disestablished in 2017
2017 mergers and acquisitions
Nexstar Media Group